Mamut Mine is an abandoned open-pit quarry mine located in the Ranau District of Sabah, Malaysia where from 1975 to 1999 various minerals primarily copper including some gold and silver were mined. The mine is known as Malaysia's only copper mine. It came to public attention due to  major environmental harm it caused.

Geology 

The source rock for the mine is adamellite porphyry and the plutons were emplaced hypabysally into Palaeogene turbiditic rocks in the Trusmadi Formation and Early Cretaceous ophiolite. The average age of porphyry stocks is 9 mega-annum (Late Miocene) with total reserves of deposit about 179 Mt Cu grade. The mine porphyry copper deposite is associated with tertiary granitoid intrusions with mineral reserves of 77 million tonnes of ore, an average grade of 0.608% copper and recoverable amounts of gold and silver.

History 
Established through a consortium between Japanese and Malaysian companies, the mine began its production in 1975 and produced a total  minerals valued at $11.5 million which was exported overseas. Towards the end of 1991, the number of workers in the mine increased to 1,191 from only 100 with 99% of those employed being Malaysian. It is estimated that together with their families, the total number of people dependent their livelihood on the mine is over 10,000. The first production of copper mine also showed that Malaysia was rich in natural resources that contributed to the country's output with most copper, silver and gold are produced in East Malaysia. Minerals gathered from the mine was trucked to Kota Belud District before being shipped to Japan for refining.

Since its closure and subsequent abandonment, waters have filled the mine which is toxic to consumption due to its highly acidic nature. In 2001, the government of Sabah through Chief Minister Chong Kah Kiat trying to attract the interest among investors to develop the abandoned mine area for tourism attraction which is ideal for resort development with the highland weather, interesting topography and scenic view of Mount Kinabalu despite no further deal are being realised. Further in 2016, Sabah Deputy Chief Minister Joseph Pairin Kitingan said the local  authorities were looking at the possibility of treating the 20.6 million cubic metre of acidic water at the mine pit to overcome water shortage in Sabah caused by drought although this proposal later were  considered by local geologist as unfeasible and costly since even if the water could be treated with acid mine drainage (AMD) method to neutralise its acidity, other minerals and heavy metals are still present in the water that made it unfit for human consumption and need more cost to clean the water.

See also 
 Mining in Malaysia

References

External links 
 

Mines in Sabah
Copper mines in Malaysia